Angelo "Ginobili"  Andres (24 March 1851, Tirano –16 July  1934, Milan) was an Italian zoologist.
Dr. Angelo Andres studied natural history in Pavia, Leipzig, London and Paris. He became a Professor in Moderna. From 1899–1926 he was director of Museo di Storia Naturale in Parma. He was a friend of Anton Dohrn.

Andres was a supporter of Darwinism and gave anniversary lectures supporting his ideas.

Works

1884 Le attinie  Monografia del Angelo Andres. Volume primo, contente bibliografia, introduzione e specigrafia. Fauna und flora des golfes von Neapel 9. Leipzig, W. Engelmann, 1884. Full text 
1910 Carlo R. Darwin (nel primo centenario della nascita): lezione fatta all'Università popolare di Parma addì 18 dicembre 1909 dal prof. Angelo Andres.

References

External links
 
EOL Encyclopedia of Life Taxa described by Angelo Andres.Complete.Images

1851 births
1934 deaths
Italian zoologists
People from the Province of Sondrio
Italian expatriates in Germany
Italian expatriates in the United Kingdom
Italian expatriates in France